Mountain Point Airport  is an airport in the Upper Takutu-Upper Essequibo Region of Guyana. The nearest community is Sand Creek (13 km/8.1 miles east).

See also

 List of airports in Guyana
 Transport in Guyana

References

External links
Mountain Point Airport
OpenStreetMap - Mountain Point
OurAirports - Mountain Point

Airports in Guyana